Hangout with Yoo is a South Korean variety show hosted by Yoo Jae-suk. Hangout with Yoo first aired on July 27, 2019.

As of September 10, 2022, 151 episodes + 1 pilot of Hangout with Yoo have aired.

Series overview

Episodes

2019
Episodes 1–23

2020
Episodes 24–73

2021
Episodes 74–119

2022
Episodes 120–166

2023 
Episodes 167-present

Notes

References

Lists of variety television series episodes
Hangout with Yoo